Joshua Coit (October 7, 1758 – September 5, 1798) was an eighteenth-century American lawyer and politician. He served as a United States Representative from Connecticut.

Early life and career
Coit was born in New London in the Connecticut Colony, the son of Joseph Coit and Lydia (Lathrop) Coit. He attended the common schools and graduated from Harvard College in 1776. Coit studied law, was admitted to the bar and began the practice of law in New London in 1779.

He served in the Connecticut House of Representatives from 1784 to 1785, 1789 to 1790, 1792 and 1793. Coit served as clerk during several terms and as speaker in 1793. He was elected as a Pro-Administration Party candidate to the Third United States Congress, and was reelected as a Federalist candidate to the Fourth United States Congress and the Fifth United States Congress, serving from 1793 until 1798. He was chairman of Committee on Elections in the Fifth Congress. Coit served as US representative from March 4, 1793, until his death in New London. He is interred in Cedar Grove Cemetery in New London.

Personal life
Coit married Ann Borradell Hallam (1765–1844) in 1784. They had six children:
Robert Coit (1785–1874), who married Charlotte Coit (1798–1874)
Lydia Coit
Leonard Coit
Fanny Coit (1792–1820)
Nancy Coit (1795–1883), who married Edward Learned (1786–1849)
Susan Coit

See also
 List of United States Congress members who died in office (1790–1899)

References

Further reading
 "Joshua Coit, American Federalist, 1758-1798" by Destler and Chester McArthur, published by the Wesleyan University Press, 1962.

External links
 
 Biographical Directory of the United States Congress
 
 The Political Graveyard
 Govtrack.us

1758 births
1798 deaths
Speakers of the Connecticut House of Representatives
Harvard College alumni
Politicians from New London, Connecticut
Burials in Connecticut
Connecticut lawyers
Federalist Party members of the United States House of Representatives from Connecticut
People of colonial Connecticut